Port Dalhousie  is a community in St. Catharines, Ontario, Canada.  Known for its waterfront appeal,  it is home to the Royal Canadian Henley Regatta and is historically significant as the terminus for the first three (19th century) routes of the Welland Canal, built in 1820, 1845 and 1889.

Activities
The city's most popular beach, on the shore of Lake Ontario, is located in Port Dalhousie at historic Lakeside Park. Popular activities that take place at the beach are stand up paddle boarding, swimming, kayaking and beach volleyball.  The park is home to the Lakeside Park Carousel which was carved by Charles I. D. Looff in 1905 and brought to St. Catharines in 1921. It continues to provide amusement for young and old alike, at just 5 cents a ride.  The Royal Canadian Henley Regatta, on Martindale Pond, has been happening for "almost 100 years".

Etymology
Port Dalhousie is named for George Ramsay, 9th Earl of Dalhousie, Governor General of British North America.  Dalhousie also gave his name to Dalhousie University in Halifax, Nova Scotia, and to the town of Dalhousie, New Brunswick.

Dalhousie pronounced his name 'dal-HOW-zee' during his time.  All of his namesakes carry this pronunciation except Port Dalhousie, and Dalhousie Street in Brantford, Ontario, which are pronounced 'duh-LOO-zee'.  It is said that this is a result of the accent of the Scottish sailors and shipbuilders who frequented the Port's establishments (Dalhousie, himself a Scot, used the more upper class English-sounding pronunciation).

Notable people
Neil Peart, drummer and lyricist of the Canadian rock band Rush, reminisces about growing up in Port Dalhousie in his book Traveling Music: Playing Back the Soundtrack to My Life and Times, as well as in his lyrics for Rush's song "Lakeside Park".

Paul Bernardo and Karla Homolka, Canadian Serial Killers, briefly rented a home here before their incarceration.

Climate

Gallery

References

External links

Neighbourhoods in St. Catharines
Populated places on Lake Ontario in Canada